Serra de Sant Pere (Saint Peter's Range) or Serra del Solà is a  long mountain range in the Baix Maestrat comarca, Valencian Community, Spain. Its highest point is Tossal de Sant Pere (541 m). The slopes are covered in low Mediterranean vegetation

Location
This moderately high mountain chain rises west of Traiguera and east of Canet lo Roig, in the transitional zone between the Mediterranean and the continental climate. It is part of the transitional area between the Iberian System and the Mediterranean System of mountains. Unlike the nearby Cervera Mountains, the summits are rarely covered in snow in the winter.

There is a ruined church building formerly dedicated to Saint Peter the Apostle close to the top of the highest peak, as well as a cave with steps. Ancient Iberian remains and steles have been found in the lower slopes of the western side of the range.

Hiking paths are well marked and there is a triangulation pillar as well as a disused, rusting antenna on the highest summit.

See also
Maestrat/Maestrazgo
Mountains of the Valencian Community

References

External links

El País Valencià poble a poble; comarca a comarca - El Baix Maestrat
José Quereda Sala, Les Moles de Xert,; Análisis Geomorfológico
El nom de Canet
Toll Negre - Flora
Ramaderia

Sant Pere
Baix Maestrat
Sant Pere